was a Japanese film director.

Career
Born in Tokyo, Furukawa graduated from the College of Art at Nihon University in 1941 and entered the Nikkatsu studio first in the screenwriting division before becoming an assistant director. After serving in the war, he returned to work at Daiei Film before returning to Nikkatsu when it resumed producing films in 1954. While working as an assistant director, he assisted such directors as Tomotaka Tasaka, Kajiro Yamamoto, Akira Kurosawa, and Heinosuke Gosho. He made his directorial debut in 1955 with Jigoku no Yōjinbō, which starred Rentarō Mikuni and for which he wrote the script. He is most known for directing Season of the Sun in 1956, which was a box office success and helped launch the career of Yujiro Ishihara. His Cruel Gun Story (1964) was released on DVD with English subtitles by Eclipse from the Criterion Collection.

Furukawa, aka Tai Kao-Mei, also directed two films in Hong Kong and dramas for television.

Furukawa died of heart failure on 4 October 2018 in a Tokyo hospital at the age of 101.

Filmography

Films 
This is a partial list of films.
 1955 Jigoku no Yōjinbō 
 1956 Season of the Sun 
 1964 Cruel Gun Story
 1967 Black Falcon - Screenwriter, Director. Mandarin language Hong Kong film.
 1967 ''Kiss and Kill - Director. Mandarin language Hong Kong film.

References

External links 
 
 
 Furukawa Takumi at hkmdb.com

Japanese film directors
1917 births
2018 deaths
People from Tokyo
Japanese centenarians
Men centenarians